Agathon Carl Theodor Fabergé, born as Agathon Herman Friedrich Fabergé (7 February 1876 – St Petersburg 20 October 1951, Helsinki) was a Russian goldsmith and philatelist. He was the son of Peter Carl Fabergé (House of Fabergé) and Augusta Julia Jacobs. He is not to be confused with his uncle and co-founder of the Fabergé jewelry firm, Agathon Fabergé.

Early life
After moving from Germany to Russia, Agathon Carl Theodor Fabergé or Agathon Karlovich was educated at the German Petrischule in St. Petersburg and in the commercial department of the Wiedemann gymnasium. In May 1895, joined his father's firm "Faberge". In the 1900s–1910s, together with his father and his brother, Evgeny Karlovich, he managed the firm's business. After 1898, he became an expert on the Diamond Room in the Winter Palace.

Philately
Fabergé formed a leading collection of Russian Zemstvo stamps.

After the success at the World Exhibition in Paris in 1900, the Faberge Company became a supplier of many monarchs. Agafon himself, who spoke five languages, was a company representative at the royal houses of England, Sweden, Norway, and Siam. In 1897, Agafon married the daughter of a wealthy Riga merchant, Lydia Treyberg. After the birth of his fourth son in 1907, his father presented Agafon a country estate (known as ) that included a two-store wooden main house, in Levashovo, not far St. Petersburg. Already the father of four children, Agathon decided to expand the dacha and commissioned the architect Johannes Leopold Hulnbeck to rebuild it. Galnbeck built an impressive Art Nouveau stone mansion on the site of the old house. Contemporaries called the estate “Small Hermitage”, because it was decorated with antique furniture, antique carpets and tapestries, porcelain and bronze, prints, icons, miniatures and sculptures. There were also two very unique collections — precious stones and stamps. 

Russian-German stamp collector from St. Petersburg, Breytfuss Friedrich (1850–1911), involved him in collecting stamps. The instructions of the experienced collector Breytfuss played an important role in forming his interest to stamps.

In 1916, Faberge retired from his father’s company and opened up an antique shop. After the February 1917 conspiracy against the tsar, the antique trade was very busy. Wealthy people leaving Russia sold rarities. There was no shortage of the buyers — the nouveau riche millionaires. The October Bolshevik coup made Faberge close the shop. There began lootings and robberies.

In June 1918, Faberge reopened the antique shop. But later, the terror unleashed by the Bolsheviks forced him to smuggle his wife and five children to Finland. In December 1918, the Bolsheviks closed all the antique shops. Faberge found a job as a translator in the Danish embassy. Six months later, according to the new denunciation, he was arrested by security officers, this time on charges of profiteering and sent to a concentration camp. Shortly after his arrest, there was a pogrom at his dacha. Everything that could not be taken away was disfigured and broken. He spent more than a year in a concentration camp, where he was considered as a "bourgeois counter-revolutionary" and was taken out to be shot three times. Torture and hunger were not in vain — the 44-year-old man had become old and gray-haired; his house, villa and property were confiscated.

In the late 1920’s, the officials involved Faberge in an urgent secret work — evaluation of a large lot of diamonds. After signing the peace with Estonia, the Bolsheviks found a channel for smuggling gold and precious stones. The interested traders came to Revel to participate in clandestine auctions. Having learned that the Bolsheviks brought “buckets” of diamonds, they decided to bring down the price and refused to buy the stones. A trade representative telegraphed Lenin that the experts deliberately overstated the price, and it was impossible to sell the stones. Faberge was arrested again on charges of sabotage. After some time, the authorities learned about his connections with the staff of the Finnish diplomatic mission and decided to make him their agent. He came out of prison only after he had given his agreement to work for the GPU. But Faberge did not want to have it on his conscience, so he confessed everything to his Finnish friends. For a while he tried to get some work. Academician A.E. Fersman helped him; he invited him to work in the commission to study production forces of Russia at the Academy of Sciences.

Death and legacy

Fabergé died in Helsinki, Finland on 20 October 1951. He was buried in the family grave at the Hietaniemi Cemetery.

See also
Georges Henri Kaestlin

References

Sources

Further reading

 

Philatelists from the Russian Empire
1876 births
1951 deaths
Goldsmiths from the Russian Empire
Agathon Carl Theodor
Businesspeople from Saint Petersburg
White Russian emigrants to Finland
Finnish people of French descent
Emigrants from the German Empire to the Russian Empire